libfixmath is a platform-independent fixed-point math library aimed at developers wanting to perform fast non-integer math on platforms lacking a (or with a low performance) FPU. It offers developers a similar interface to the standard math.h functions for use on Q16.16 fixed-point numbers. libfixmath has no external dependencies other than stdint.h and a compiler which supports 64-bit integer arithmetic (such as GCC).
Conditional compilation options exist to remove the requirement for a 64-bit capable compiler as many compilers for microcontrollers and DSPs do not support 64-bit arithmetic.

History
libfixmath was developed by Ben Brewer and first released publicly as part of the Dingoo SDK. It has since been used to implement a software 3D graphics library called FGL.

Q16.16 functions

Other functions

Performance
For the most intensive function (atan2) benchmark results show the following results:

Note: These results were calculated using fixtest with caching optimizations turned off.

Licensing
libfixmath is released under the MIT License, a permissive free software licence, and is free software.

See also

 Binary scaling
 Fixed-point arithmetic
 Floating-point arithmetic
 Q (number format)

References

External links
 Project Page
 Group Page/Mailing List

Numerical software
C (programming language) libraries
Free computer libraries
Free software programmed in C